The men's sanda 70 kilograms competition at the 2014 Asian Games in Incheon, South Korea was held from 21 September to 24 September at the Ganghwa Dolmens Gymnasium.

A total of nine competitors from nine different countries (NOCs) competed in this event, limited to fighters whose body weight was less than 70 kilograms.

Zhang Kun from China won the gold medal after beating his opponent Yoo Sang-hoon of South Korea in gold medal bout 2–0, Zhang won both periods by the same score of 5–0.

The bronze medal was shared by Sajjad Abbasi from Iran and Maratab Ali Shah from Pakistan. Athletes from Afghanistan, Turkmenistan, Kyrgyzstan and Jordan lost in the second round (quarterfinals) and finished on fifth place. Ruslan Libirov of Kazakhstan was the only athlete losing in the pre-quarterfinal round.

Schedule
All times are Korea Standard Time (UTC+09:00)

Results
Legend
KO — Won by knockout
TV — Technical victory

References

External links
Official website

Men's sanda 70 kg